Hailo was a British technology platform that matched taxi drivers and passengers through its mobile phone application. Founded in London in 2011, the Hailo taxi service was available in 16 cities (as of December 2013).

By May 2013, Hailo had enabled more than three million rides for passengers from over 30,000 registered taxi drivers.

The Hailo Passenger App was available as a free download from the App Store and Google Play for both iOS and Android devices.

In late 2016, Hailo was absorbed by myTaxi, a German e-hailing company belonging to Daimler Financial Services, to form the largest e-hailing operator. The resulting company, branded mytaxi, is based in Hamburg.

By July 1, 2019, mytaxi was rebranded to Free Now serving over 100 European cities including Barcelona, Berlin, Dublin, Paris, and London. Free Now customer care and support teams operate from Dublin, Hamburg, Madrid, Warsaw among other European countries.

History

Hailo began in late 2010, after a meeting between three London taxi drivers and three technology entrepreneurs, including co-founders Jay Bregman, CEO, Ron Zeghibe, Executive Chairman, Caspar Woolley, Chief Operations Officer, and Russell Hall, Gary Jackson, and Terry Runham, Driver Community Leaders.

On November 1, 2011, Hailo officially launched to passengers in London. By the end of 2012, Hailo had launched in Dublin, Boston, Toronto, and Chicago, but by late 2014 had discontinued services in North America.

Funding
To date, Hailo has raised approximately $125.1 million in funding.
Hailo received $3.0 million in two tranches of Seed round funding in 2011. 
In March 2012, Hailo received $17m in Series A round funding led by Accel Partners. The round also included contributions from both Atomico and Wellington Partners.
A $30.6m Series B investment round was secured in December 2012, led by Union Square Ventures. Contributions were also made by Japanese mobile telecoms group KDDI and business magnate Sir Richard Branson.

Cities

Notes
Includes $0.50 mandatory state surcharge
Translates to The App for Taxis in Barcelona
Marketed in both English and French
Translates to The App for Taxis in Madrid
Atlanta, Tokyo, and the remainder of Ireland are currently locations that Hailo plans on serving in the future.
Hailo shuttered its North American operations in late 2014 in Canada and the US citing low profits and increased competition from Uber and Lyft - http://www.cbc.ca/news/business/hailo-taxi-app-to-close-up-shop-in-toronto-and-montreal-1.2798283

Mobile application and e-hailing

A survey conducted by Hailo found that cab drivers spend an average of 40-60 percent of their time looking for fares.
 
The Hailo mobile e-hail application uses mobile and GPS technology to match taxi drivers with passengers based on both availability and proximity.
Hailo passengers make two taps on the Hailo smartphone app in order to request and confirm their e-hail.
Once a driver has electronically accepted a passenger, the waiting passenger is sent an updated time of arrival based on route information and real-time traffic information.

Customers also have the ability to specify if they require a wheelchair-accessible vehicle or a fixed price fare to designated location such as an airport terminal, where permitted.
The Hailo driver app includes social networking features, which allows drivers to alert each other of locations with high street fare demand, traffic conditions, speed traps and road construction obstacles.
 
Both the Hailo passenger and driver apps are compatible with both iOS and Android mobile devices.

Mobile commerce

Hailo enables its registered passengers to e-hail, pay and tip for taxi journeys using the credit or debit card details they have stored within Hailo's secure cloud wallet.

In some city locations, taxi drivers can also use Hailo to process credit and debit card payments for street hail fares by manually entering passenger card details when they reach their destination.

Instant trip receipts are sent to passengers by email and contain journey and payment information along with instructions to help retrieve any property lost or forgotten in the taxi.

Legal proceedings
In February 2013, Black Car Assistance Corporation and Livery Roundtable filed a lawsuit against the taxi and limousine commission to prevent e-hailing companies from expanding to New York City.
In April 2013, a judge dismissed the lawsuit and Hailo won the right to begin an e-hail beta trial. The decision was subsequently appealed.
After a second temporary restraining order was issued against the pilot program, Hailo became the only taxi-hailing app-maker to join the lawsuit in support of the city.

On 30 July 2021 Southcab Ltd Acquires the UK trademark Hailo which they would be running alongside their website Urban Taxi

References

https://trademarks.ipo.gov.uk/ipo-tmcase/page/Results/1/UK00003612177

Transport companies established in 2011
Taxis
2011 establishments in England
Ridesharing companies of the United Kingdom
Companies based in London